The following is a list of awards and nominations by American film director, screenwriter, producer, and editor Wes Craven. He is best known for his work in the horror film genre, particularly slasher films. Throughout his career, Craven was nominated for and won numerous awards, including multiple Saturn Awards and film festival honors.

In 1977, Craven won the critics award at the Sitges Film Festival for his horror film The Hills Have Eyes. In 1997, the Gérardmer Film Festival granted him the Grand Prize for the slasher film Scream. In 2012, the New York City Horror Film Festival awarded Craven the Lifetime Achievement Award.

Awards and nominations

Special awards

See also
Wes Craven

External links

References

Craven